The Durant Affair is a 1962 British drama film directed by Godfrey Grayson and starring Jane Griffiths, Conrad Phillips and Nigel Green.

Plot
A will is contested in court after a fortune is granted to an unexpected heiress.

Cast
 Jane Griffiths - Mary Grant
 Conrad Phillips - Julian Armour
 Nigel Green - Sir Patrick
 Simon Lack - Roland Farley
 Katharine Pate - Ethel Durant
 Francis de Wolff
 Richard Caldicot
 Ann Lancaster

References

External links

1962 films
1962 drama films
Films directed by Godfrey Grayson
British drama films
Films shot at New Elstree Studios
1960s English-language films
1960s British films